Deroceras is a taxonomic genus of small to medium-sized air-breathing land slugs in the family Agriolimacidae.

Description
Most species reach only 30–35 mm in length (max 45 mm). Coloration varies considerably within and between species but common patterns are pale cream, with or without darker flecks (never stripes), and a more uniform light gray or brown to black-brown. Mucus is usually colourless but in some species includes a white deposit when the slug has been disturbed. No keel continues from the tail along the back. The mantle is large (up to half the body length), containing a shell plate internally. The pneumostome lies in the posterior half of the mantle. Generally external appearance does not reliably distinguish one species from certain others, so species identification requires dissection to reveal the genitalia, unless the local species diversity is known to be low.

The taxonomy, anatomy and other aspects of the biology of this genus were reviewed in 2000, and the diverse mating behaviors were reviewed in 2007.

Species
In 2000, in the most recent monograph on the genus, Wiktor rejected earlier attempts (including his own) at a subgeneric (Agriolimax Mörch, 1865, Plathystimulus Wiktor, 1973) classification, because there appeared to be so many convergences and reversals. The only exception was that he split off Liolytopelte as a subgenus because of its distinctive hard plate within the penis; all other species were included in the subgenus Deroceras.

There are at least 123 species in the genus Deroceras.

Subgenus Deroceras Rafinesque, 1820

 Deroceras abessinicum
 Deroceras adolphi
 Deroceras afer
 Deroceras agreste (Linnaeus, 1758)
 Deroceras altaicum
 Deroceras altimirai
 Deroceras astypalaeensis
 Deroceras bakurianum
 Deroceras barceum
 Deroceras berytensis
 Deroceras bisacchianum
 Deroceras bistimulatum
 Deroceras boeoticum
 Deroceras boettgeri
 Deroceras bulgaricum
 Deroceras cazioti
 Deroceras cecconii
 Deroceras chevallieri
 Deroceras christae
 Deroceras chrysorroyatissensis
 Deroceras concrementosum
 Deroceras cycladicum
 Deroceras dallaii
 Deroceras deckeni
 Deroceras demirtensis
 Deroceras dubium
 Deroceras ercinae
 Deroceras famagustensis
 Deroceras fatrense
 Deroceras gardullanum
 Deroceras gavdosensis
 Deroceras giustianum
 Deroceras glandulosum
 Deroceras golcheri
 Deroceras gorgonium
 Deroceras halieos
 Deroceras helicoidale
 Deroceras hesperium
 Deroceras heterura
 Deroceras ikaria
 Deroceras ilium
 Deroceras invadens
 Deroceras johannae
 Deroceras juranum
 Deroceras karnaniensis
 Deroceras kasium
 Deroceras keaensis
 Deroceras kontanum
 Deroceras korthionensis
 Deroceras koschanum
 Deroceras kythirensis
 Deroceras laeve (O. F. Müller, 1774) 
 Deroceras lasithionensis
 Deroceras levisarcobelum
 Deroceras libanoticum
 Deroceras limacoides
 Deroceras lombricoides
 Deroceras lothari
 Deroceras maasseni
 Deroceras malkini
 Deroceras melinum
 Deroceras minoicum
 Deroceras neuteboomi
 Deroceras nigroclypeatum
 Deroceras nitidum
 Deroceras nyphoni
 Deroceras oertzeni
 Deroceras orduensis
 Deroceras osseticum
 Deroceras padisii
 Deroceras pageti
 Deroceras panormitanum (Lessona & Pollonera, 1882) 
 Deroceras parium
 Deroceras parnasium
 Deroceras planarioides
 Deroceras ponsonbyi
 Deroceras praecox
 Deroceras pseudopanormitanum
 Deroceras rethimnonensis
 Deroceras reticulatum (O. F. Müller, 1774) 
 Deroceras rhodensis
 Deroceras riedelianum
 Deroceras roblesi
 Deroceras rodnae
 Deroceras samium
 Deroceras seriphium
 Deroceras sturanyi
 Deroceras subagreste
 Deroceras tarracense
 Deroceras tauricum
 Deroceras thersites
 Deroceras turcicum
 Deroceras uataderensis
 Deroceras vascoana
 Deroceras zilchi

Subgenus Liolytopelte Simroth, 1901
 Deroceras bureschi
 Deroceras caucasicum
 Deroceras kandaharensis
 Deroceras moldavicum
 Deroceras occidentalis
 Deroceras trabzonensis

Relevance to humans 

Several species in this genus are recognised as pests of agriculture and horticulture, including Deroceras reticulatum, Deroceras invadens, Deroceras agreste, and Deroceras laeve.

References 

Agriolimacidae
Gastropod genera
Agricultural pest molluscs
Taxa named by Constantine Samuel Rafinesque